The 11th Infantry Division is an active formation of the Pakistan Army. It is currently deployed in Lahore as part of IV Corps, and is responsible for the defence of that city and the surrounding areas.

The division was formed just before the Indo-Pakistani War of 1965. Prior to this, the army chief at the time, General Muhammad Musa, had been calling for raising two new divisions;  this was denied by the government citing a benign security environment, the lack of funds and the general reluctance of the US to fund new risings under the foreign military assistance scheme.

After the 1962 Sino-Indian War, the Indian army underwent a substantial increase in numbers and capability and, therefore, the Pakistani government reversed its position and the division was raised by utilising reserve GOC, Major General Abdul Hamid Khan. The Division was then assigned to the defence of Lahore.

1965 War
The Division as a whole first went into action at the Battle of Lahore, though individual units had seen action already in the Rann of Kutch and in Operation Grand Slam. It, along with the 10th Division, successfully withstood the Indian assault towards Lahore, with the 11th fighting in the Kasur region. After this battle, the division was committed to the Khem Karan offensive, for which the Divisional HQ was given command of the 1st Armoured Division. The two formations successfully managed to capture Khem Karan, though further attacks by the 1st Armoured were checked by the Indians. At the same time as the fighting in Khem Karan, the Indian offensive towards Sialkot was making progress at the Battle of Chawinda and the 1st Armoured was withdrawn to reinforce the Pakistani forces in that sector. The 11th was forced to fall back to Khem Karan, where it withstood multiple attempts by the Indians to retake the town, however the ceasefire found the division in command of the town and several hundred square kilometres of Indian territory.

1971 War
Six years later, the division once again went into action in the 1971 war, and in a repeat of the experience in 1965, the Division crossed the Radcliffe Line, the international border, once more.
106 Brigade succeeded in overwhelming the resistance of the Indian 15th Battalion, Punjab Regiment (35 Infantry Brigade, 14th Infantry Division of India) to take significant ground near Hussainiwala, thereby controlling a key dam and threatening the border town of Ferozepur. One of the famous features that the formation captured was the Qaisar-e-Hind Fort.

Present

The division is at present deployed around Lahore and has the following composition:
21st Infantry Brigade, Lahore
52nd Infantry Brigade, Lahore
106th Infantry Brigade, Lahore
Artillery Brigade, Lahore
15th Heavy Mechanized Brigade, Lahore

References

External links
A tank belonging to the division advances. '65 War

Divisions of the Pakistan Army
Military units and formations established in 1965